Kim Byong-gun (born 15 November 1955) is a North Korean judoka. He competed in the men's lightweight event at the 1980 Summer Olympics.

References

1955 births
Living people
North Korean male judoka
Olympic judoka of North Korea
Judoka at the 1980 Summer Olympics
Place of birth missing (living people)